The following is a list of Major League Soccer coaches — including lists of current coaches and coaches with most wins. Major League Soccer is a Division 1 professional soccer league, with 29 teams — 26 in the United States and 3 in Canada.

Current MLS coaches

Most coaching wins

Regular season wins
 Bruce Arena (250)
 Sigi Schmid (240)
 Bob Bradley (191)
 Peter Vermes (182)
 Dominic Kinnear (170)
 Oscar Pareja (140)
 Frank Yallop (130)
 Jason Kreis (121)
 Ben Olsen (113)
 Steve Nicol (112)

Notes
 Last updated: October 1, 2022
 Coaches in bold are still coaching in MLS.

Post season wins
 Bruce Arena (35)
 Sigi Schmid (26)
 Bob Bradley (15)
 Dominic Kinnear (15)
 Brian Schmetzer (15)

Achievements

The following table shows the MLS head coaches that have won the Coach of the Year, MLS Cup, or Supporters' Shield at least twice.

List of all-time coaches 
The list of coaches includes everyone who has coached a club while they were in the MLS, whether in a permanent or temporary role. Interim coaches are listed only when they managed the team for at least one match in that period.

Coaches highlighted in yellow and in italics  are currently coaching an MLS club.

See also
 Sigi Schmid Coach of the Year Award
 List of MLS Cup winning head coaches

References

External links

 
Current MLS coaches
Major League Soccer